We Have Arrived is the debut studio album by American thrash metal band Dark Angel, released in March 1985.

We Have Arrived has been reissued at least two times. In 1986, it was re-released by the French recording label Axe Killer in a 2,000 number limited edition. It was then re-released once again in 1997 by Axe Killer. The label attached to the plastic wrap says that this is a remastered edition, but there is no indication of it in the booklet. We Have Arrived is the only Dark Angel album to feature Jack Schwartz on drums, as Gene Hoglan replaced him as their drummer on subsequent albums.

One of the songs from this album, "Merciless Death", was re-recorded for their next album Darkness Descends.

Reception

The album was met with mixed reactions. Reviewer Eduardo Rivadavia of AllMusic gave the album a 1.5 of 5 saying "Dark Angel's arrogantly titled debut We Have Arrived is as primitive as it gets." and "The album will only interest serious thrash enthusiasts." Canadian journalist Martin Popoff compared the music on the album to the German thrash school and to early Slayer-style; he found sonic affinity with Death, but "loud, fast and crude in comparison".

Track listing

Personnel
Dark Angel
Don Doty – vocals
Eric Meyer – guitar
Jim Durkin – guitar
Rob Yahn – bass
Jack Schwartz – drums

Production
Bill Metoyer – engineer
Vadim Rubin, Mike Siegal – executive producers

References

Dark Angel (band) albums
1985 debut albums